Lee Hye-sook (born September 4, 1962) is a South Korean actress. She began acting in 1979, and has remained active in Korean cinema and television since. Lee is best known for the 1991 film Silver Stallion, in which she portrayed a young widow who was raped by an American soldier from a nearby base, then afterwards shunned by her village and driven to poverty and prostitution.

Filmography

Film

Television series

Variety show

Awards and nominations

References

External links
 
 
 

1962 births
Living people
Actresses from Seoul
South Korean film actresses
South Korean television actresses
Hanyang University alumni
Best Actress Paeksang Arts Award (film) winners